Kirkemo is a Norwegian surname that may refer to the following notable people:
Folke Kirkemo (1899–1967), Norwegian football player
H. E. Kirkemo (1894–1987), American architect 
Leland Kirkemo (1920–2010), United States Navy captain of Norwegian origin

Norwegian-language surnames